The black solitaire (Entomodestes coracinus) is a species of bird in the family Turdidae. It is found in Colombia and Ecuador. Its natural habitats are subtropical or tropical moist lowland forests and subtropical or tropical moist montane forests.

References

black solitaire
Birds of the Colombian Andes
Birds of the Ecuadorian Andes
black solitaire
Taxonomy articles created by Polbot